Sir Charles Edwards (19 February 1867 – 15 June 1954) was a Labour Party politician in the United Kingdom.

Edwards was elected at the 1918 general election as Member of Parliament (MP) for the newly created Bedwellty constituency in Monmouthshire.  He held the seat until he retired from Parliament at the 1950 general election.

He was made a Privy Councillor in 1940, and from 1940 to 1942 he was government chief whip in the war-time Coalition Government.

References 

 

1867 births
1954 deaths
Members of the Privy Council of the United Kingdom
Miners' Federation of Great Britain-sponsored MPs
Ministers in the Churchill wartime government, 1940–1945
National Union of Mineworkers-sponsored MPs
UK MPs 1918–1922
UK MPs 1922–1923
UK MPs 1923–1924
UK MPs 1924–1929
UK MPs 1929–1931
UK MPs 1931–1935
UK MPs 1935–1945
UK MPs 1945–1950
Welsh Labour Party MPs